Creigiau is a dormitory settlement in the north-west of Cardiff, the capital of Wales. The village currently has about 1,500 houses and a population of approximately 5,000 people. The Cardiff electoral ward is called Creigiau & St Fagans. The village has a strong Welsh-speaking community, and along with Pentyrch has one of the largest clusters of Welsh-speakers in Cardiff. 23.4% of the village speaks Welsh.

History 
Creigiau's former industrial centre was a quarry, which opened in the 1870s and closed in 2001. The village was linked to Cardiff and Barry by the Barry Railway's  railway station, located on the eastern edge of the village, which was closed as part of the Beeching cuts. The Welsh language has always had a strong presence in Creigiau and the majority of its inhabitants still spoke Welsh in 1890.

In the mid-1970s, housing estates sprang up to accommodate commuters. A further large housing estate was built during the 1980s to further accommodate the growing number of commuters wanting to live in the village. This estate is still locally known as "the new estate" or "lower Creigiau".

Creigiau became part of the Unitary authority of Cardiff in 1996 following Local Government reorganisation.

Castell-y-mynach
Castell-y-mynach is a late medieval manor house, reputedly built in the fifteenth century. It was remodelled in the early seventeenth century and contains seventeenth and eighteenth century wall paintings. The house is now surrounded by a modern housing development.

Creigiau Pottery 
A pottery studio was set up by Reg and Jean Southcliffe in 1947 as the Southcliffe Ceramic Company, renamed to Creigiau Pottery in 1948. Creigiau produced domestic tableware in either a pale grey glaze, or their best-known copper lustreware. A distinctive Creigiau piece is their kitsch Welsh Pie Dragon, a lustreware pie funnel in the shape of a Welsh dragon rather than the usual bird.

In 1962, Tom also took over the Claypits Pottery at Ewenny, nearby to the Ewenny Pottery. He renamed it Vale Pottery, after the Vale of Glamorgan, it later being renamed again under new owners as Helyg Pottery.

Governance
Creigiau was formerly an electoral ward to Taff Ely Borough Council. In 1995 Creigiau became part of Cardiff and the ward elected a Plaid Cymru councillor, Delme Bowen, to Cardiff Council (Cardiff's first Plaid Cymru councillor for 23 years).

Since 1999 Creigiau has been covered by a new ward, Creigiau & St Fagans.

Amenities 
Local amenities include a bilingual primary school, which teaches through the medium of both Welsh and English, a golf club, a convenience store with a post office, a recreation ground managed by village residents (home of local archery, cricket, football, petanque and tennis clubs), a GP surgery, and local pub called 'The Creigiau Inn'.

Transport 
A few bus routes serve the area, mainly operated by Stagecoach and Cardiff Bus

A new Rapid Transit Line could be built from Creigiau to St Mellons in Cardiff, via Cardiff City Centre and the Welsh Parliament by 2024. Plans for the South Wales Metro include this line as part of the "Cardiff Crossrail Project", which could also mean the line could be extended further.

References

External links 
Photos of Creigiau and surrounding area

Former electoral wards of Cardiff
Villages in Cardiff